Hornos Railroad (Ferrocarril de Hornos) was a  narrow gauge railway owned by Hacienda de Hornos in Mexico.  Hacienda de Hornos was a large grain and cattle ranch in southwestern Coahuila near Torreón.  The line extended  from an interchange with the Mexican International Railway at Hornos through Hacienda de Hornos to Alamito with a  branch to interchange with the Ferrocarril Coahuila y Pacifico at Viesca.  Construction began at Hornos in 1902, and the line began common-carrier freight and passenger service in 1904 with two daily trains in each direction between Hornos and Viesca.  Twenty-ton locomotive #4 was the only  narrow gauge 2-8-2 ever built for North American service.  The railroad was damaged by the Mexican Revolution in 1914; and the last public timetable was published in 1930 for a single daily mixed train with no service to Alamito.  The line disappears from government records after 1945.

Locomotives

References 

 

Defunct railway companies of Mexico
2 ft gauge railways in Mexico
History of Coahuila
Transportation in Coahuila
Railway companies established in 1902
1902 establishments in Mexico
Railway lines opened in 1904